Jung Woo-ram (born June 1, 1985) is a South Korean professional baseball pitcher for the Hanwha Eagles of the KBO League.

He represented South Korea at the 2018 Asian Games.

After the 2019 season, he became a free agent and stayed at 3.9 billion won in total for four years.

References

External links
Career statistics and player information from Korea Baseball Organization

Jung Woo-ram at SK Wyverns Baseball Club 

1985 births
Living people
Baseball players at the 2018 Asian Games
Asian Games gold medalists for South Korea
Medalists at the 2018 Asian Games
Asian Games medalists in baseball
KBO League pitchers
SSG Landers players
South Korean baseball players
Sportspeople from Busan
2015 WBSC Premier12 players